Stynes is a surname. Notable people with the name include:

Brian Stynes (born 1971), Irish Gaelic footballer 
Chris Stynes (born 1973), American baseball player
David Stynes (born 1976) Irish Gaelic footballer and Australian rules footballer
Jim Stynes (1966–2012), Irish-born Gaelic and Australian rules footballer
Joe Stynes (1903–1991), Irish Republican and sportsman
Jule Styne (1905–1994), British-American songwriter and composer
Neil Stynes (1868–1944), American Major League Baseball catcher
Yumi Stynes (born 1975), Australian television and radio presenter

See also
Styn (disambiguation)
Trevor Stines (born 1996), American actor
Steins (disambiguation)